Shakespeare's Villains is a one-man play, created and performed by Steven Berkoff.

Following its first run at London's Theatre Royal, Haymarket (7 July – 8 August 1998) where it was produced by Berkoff's East Productions and Marc Sinden (who also co-directed), it was nominated for The Society of London Theatre Laurence Olivier Award for Best Entertainment.

Performed around the world by Berkoff since 1998, the piece explores and analyses Shakespeare's most villainous characters, including Iago, the Macbeths, Shylock and Richard III – characters who are inherently evil and whose situation leads them to do evil deeds, or who are at the mercy of an evil society.

References

1998 plays
West End plays
Plays for one performer
Literature about literature
Plays by Steven Berkoff
Plays and musicals based on works by William Shakespeare